Hasdrubal the Boetharch (ʿAzrubaʿal) was a Carthaginian general during the Third Punic War. Little is known about him. "Boetharch" was a Carthaginian office, the exact function of which is unclear, but which is not to be confused with the Greek boeotarch.

Life
His real name was Hasdrubal Barca and he was the grandson of Hannibal Barca from the Second Punic War and Battle of Zama. He himself led the Carthaginian forces in the Third Punic War. He may have been the same Hasdrubal who was defeated at the Battle of Oroscopa in 151 BC by the Numidian king, Masinissa. He and his army were defeated in the final Siege of Carthage in 146 BC. Their defeat by Scipio Aemilianus, proconsul of the Roman Republic, brought the war to a close. Hasdrubal's military skill was not to be doubted, as his army had been well-trained and equipped. His work at defending Carthage cost the Romans a difficult campaign to suppress the defenders. His tactical skills, however, were dwarfed by his contemporaries Massinissa and Scipio.

Hasdrubal had a wife and two sons, who, according to Polybius, threw themselves into a burning temple when they witnessed their army's defeat. Hasdrubal had surrendered himself to the Romans prior to his family's deaths, an act possibly provoking their suicide. He was taken to Rome and displayed during Scipio's triumph, but later allowed to live in peace in Italy.

See also
 Other Hasdrubals in Carthaginian history

References

Citations

Bibliography
 .
 .  
 .
 Book XXXVIII of Polybius's Histories, English trans., 7–8,20
 .

External links 

 Polybius, Fragments of Book XXXVIII, 7
 Livius.org: Hasdrubal
 William Smith, "Dictionary of Greek and Roman biography and mythology, Volume 2", C.C. Little and J. Brown, 1849 .

Year of birth missing
Year of death missing
Carthaginians
Carthaginian generals
Third Punic War
2nd-century BC Punic people